The list of French footballers in Serie A records the association football players from France who have appeared at least once for a team in the Italian Serie A. Entries in bold denote players still active in current season.

A
Yacine Adli – Milan – 2022–
Michel Adopo – Torino – 2019–20, 2022–
Lucien Agoumé – Inter, Spezia – 2019–21
Marley Aké – Juventus – 2021–22
Jimmy Algerino – Venezia – 2001–02
Kelvin Amian – Spezia – 2021–
Nicolas Anelka – Juventus – 2012–13
Janis Antiste – Spezia, Sassuolo – 2021–23
Florian Ayé – Brescia – 2019–20

B
Ibrahim Ba – Milan, Perugia – 1997–2003
Jean-Christophe Bahebeck – Pescara – 2016–17
Tiémoué Bakayoko – Milan, Napoli – 2018–19, 2020–22
Anthony Basso – Udinese – 2000–01
Brian Bayeye – Torino – 2022–
Jonathan Biabiany – Parma, Inter, Sampdoria – 2009–17, 2018–19
Philippe Billy – Lecce – 2001–02, 2003–04, 2005–06
Laurent Blanc – Napoli, Inter – 1991–92, 1999–2001
Jocelyn Blanchard – Juventus – 1998–99
Alexis Blin – Lecce – 2022–
Alain Boghossian – Napoli, Sampdoria, Parma – 1994–2002
Warren Bondo – Monza – 2022–23
Emile Bongiorni – Torino – 1948–49
Antoine Bonifaci – Inter, Bologna, Torino, Vicenza – 1954–59, 1960–61
Daniel Bravo – Parma – 1996–97
Jérémie Bréchet – Inter – 2003–04

C
Zoumana Camara – Empoli – 1998–99
Vincent Candela – Roma, Udinese, Siena, Messina – 1996–2007
Benoît Cauet – Inter, Torino, Como – 1997–2003
Michaël Ciani – Lazio – 2012–15
Djibril Cissé – Lazio – 2011–12
Kingsley Coman – Juventus – 2014–16
Nestor Combin – Juventus, Varese, Torino, Milan – 1964–71
Jean-Christophe Coubronne – Novara – 2011–12
Michaël Cuisance – Venezia, Sampdoria – 2021–
Jean-Pierre Cyprien – Torino, Lecce – 1994–95, 1997–98
Wylan Cyprien – Parma – 2020–21

D

Ousmane Dabo – Inter, Vicenza, Parma, Atalanta, Lazio – 1998–2006, 2007–10
Olivier Dacourt – Roma, Inter – 2002–09
Stéphane Dalmat – Inter – 2000–03
Sebastian De Maio – Brescia, Genoa, Fiorentina, Bologna, Udinese – 2010–11, 2013–22
Marcel Desailly – Milan – 1993–98
Didier Deschamps – Juventus – 1994–99
Vikash Dhorasoo – Milan – 2004–05
Moussa Diaby – Crotone – 2017–18
Modibo Diakité – Lazio, Fiorentina, Cagliari, Frosinone, Sampdoria – 2006–12, 2013–16
Oumar Dieng – Sampdoria – 1996–98
Lucas Digne – Roma – 2015–16
Martin Djetou – Parma – 2001–02
Youri Djorkaeff – Inter – 1996–99
Bruce Dombolo – Ancona – 2003–04
Christophe Dugarry – Milan – 1996–97

E
Steeve-Mike Eboa Ebongue – Genoa – 2020–21
Patrice Evra – Juventus – 2014–17
Valentin Eysseric – Fiorentina, Verona – 2017–21

F
Joachim Fernandez – Udinese – 1997–98
Mathieu Flamini – Milan – 2008–13
Nicolas Frey – Chievo – 2008–17, 2018–19
Sébastien Frey – Inter, Verona, Parma, Fiorentina, Genoa – 1998–2013

G
Valentin Gendrey – Lecce – 2022–
Gaël Genevier – Perugia, Siena – 2003–04, 2009–10
Ludovic Giuly – Roma – 2007–08
Eddy Gnahoré – Crotone – 2016–17
Olivier Giroud – Milan – 2021–
Maxime Gonalons – Roma – 2017–18
Yoann Gourcuff – Milan – 2006–08
Clément Grenier – Roma – 2016–17

H
Thierry Henry – Juventus – 1998–99
Thomas Henry – Venezia, Verona – 2021–
Theo Hernández – Milan – 2019–
Thomas Heurtaux – Udinese, Verona – 2012–18

I
Jonathan Ikoné – Fiorentina – 2021–

K
Pierre Kalulu – Milan – 2020–
Olivier Kapo – Juventus – 2004–05
Yann Karamoh – Inter, Parma, Torino – 2017–21, 2022–
Ibrahim Karamoko – Chievo – 2018–19
Isaac Karamoko – Sassuolo – 2020–21
Christian Karembeu – Sampdoria – 1995–97
Abdoulay Konko – Siena, Genoa, Lazio, Atalanta – 2006–08, 2010–17

L
Alban Lafont – Fiorentina – 2018–19
Pierre Laigle – Sampdoria – 1996–99
Sabri Lamouchi – Parma, Inter – 2000–04
Armand Laurienté – Sassuolo – 2022–
Vincent Laurini – Empoli, Fiorentina, Parma – 2014–21
Lucien Leduc – Venezia – 1949–50
Maxime Lopez – Sassuolo – 2020–

M
Yann M'Vila – Inter – 2014–15
Jean-Victor Makengo – Udinese – 2020–23
Mike Maignan – Milan – 2021–
Thomas Mangani – Chievo – 2014–15
Blaise Matuidi – Juventus – 2017–20
Soualiho Meïté – Torino, Milan, Cremonese – 2018–21, 2022–
Jérémy Ménez – Roma, Milan – 2008–11, 2014–16
Philippe Mexès – Roma, Milan – 2004–16
Johan Micoud – Parma – 2000–02
François Modesto – Cagliari – 1999–2000
Anthony Mounier – Bologna, Atalanta – 2015–17
Lys Mousset – Salernitana – 2021–22

N
Lilian Nalis – Chievo – 2002–03
Tanguy Ndombélé – Napoli – 2022–
Bruno Ngotty – Milan, Venezia – 1998–2000
Aurélien Nguiamba – Spezia – 2021–22
Ferenc Nyers – Lazio – 1948–50
Steven Nzonzi – Roma – 2018–19

O
Rémi Oudin – Lecce – 2022–

P

Jean-Pierre Papin – Milan – 1992–94
Reynald Pedros – Parma, Napoli – 1996–98
Marc Pfertzel – Livorno – 2004–07
Michel Platini – Juventus – 1982–87
Paul Pogba – Juventus – 2012–16, 2022–
William Prunier – Napoli – 1997–98

R
Adrien Rabiot – Juventus – 2019–
Adil Rami – Milan – 2013–15
Julien Rantier – Atalanta – 2002–03
Anthony Réveillère – Napoli – 2013–14
Frank Ribéry – Fiorentina, Salernitana – 2019–23

S

Junior Sambia – Salernitana – 2022–
Bacary Sagna – Benevento – 2017–18
Louis Saha – Lazio – 2012–13
Christophe Sanchez – Bologna – 1998–2000
Franck Sauzée – Atalanta – 1993–94
Mikaël Silvestre – Inter – 1998–99
Brandon Soppy – Udinese, Atalanta – 2021–
Adama Soumaoro – Genoa, Bologna – 2019–
Samuel Souprayen – Verona – 2015–16, 2017–18 dual Réunionais international

T

Florian Thauvin – Udinese – 2022–
Cyril Théréau – Chievo, Udinese, Fiorentina, Cagliari – 2010–19
Lilian Thuram – Parma, Juventus – 1996–2006
Abdoulaye Touré – Genoa – 2021–22
Matteo Tramoni – Cagliari – 2020–21
David Trezeguet – Juventus – 2000–06, 2007–10

U
Samuel Umtiti – Lecce – 2022–

V

William Vainqueur – Roma – 2015–16
Jordan Veretout – Fiorentina, Roma – 2017–22
Patrick Vieira – Milan, Juventus, Inter – 1995–96, 2005–10

W
Maryan Wisnieski – Sampdoria – 1963–64

Y
Mapou Yanga-Mbiwa – Roma – 2014–15

Z

Jonathan Zebina – Cagliari, Roma, Juventus, Brescia – 1998–2006, 2007–11
Zinedine Zidane – Juventus – 1996–2001

See also
List of foreign Serie A players
Serie A Foreign Footballer of the Year

Notes

References 

Italy
 French
Expatriate footballers in Italy
French expatriate footballers
French expatriate footballers
Association football player non-biographical articles